Dawn of Night is a fantasy novel by Paul S. Kemp, set in the world of the Forgotten Realms, and based on the Dungeons & Dragons role-playing game. It is the second novel in "The Erevis Cale Trilogy". It was published in paperback in June 2004.  The Erevis Cale Trilogy was later reprinted as an omnibus in June 2010.

Plot summary
Erevis Cale has gained more power and taken on more responsibility as a follower of the deity Mask.

Reception
Critic Don D'Ammassa opined that "the story is quite well done, although you won't be particularly surprised by any of the plot twists."

References

2004 American novels

Forgotten Realms novels